Sigurður Einarsson (born 28 September 1962) is an Icelandic former javelin thrower. He competed at the Olympics in 1984, 1988 and 1992. His best result was 5th place in 1992.

External links

1962 births
Living people
Sigurdur Einarsson
Athletes (track and field) at the 1984 Summer Olympics
Athletes (track and field) at the 1988 Summer Olympics
Athletes (track and field) at the 1992 Summer Olympics
Sigurdur Einarsson